Peter Wyatt Kininmonth (23 June 1924 – 5 October 2007) was a Scottish international rugby union player, who played for  and the Lions. He also played for Oxford University and Richmond RFC. He was educated at Sedbergh School.

He was on the 1950 British Lions tour to New Zealand and Australia.

He was also a businessman and High Sheriff of Greater London in 1979–80.

References

1924 births
2007 deaths
British & Irish Lions rugby union players from Scotland
Oxford University RFC players
People educated at Sedbergh School
Richmond F.C. players
Rugby union players from Bebington
Scotland international rugby union players
Scottish rugby union players